The 2002–03 Australia Tri-Nation Series (more commonly known as the 2002–03 VB Series) was a One Day International (ODI) cricket tri-series where Australia played host to England and Sri Lanka. Australia and England reached the Finals, which Australia won 2–0.

Squads

Points table

Group stage

1st Match: Australia v England

2nd Match: Australia v England

3rd Match: England v Sri Lanka

4th Match: England v Sri Lanka

5th Match: Australia v Sri Lanka

6th Match: Australia v Sri Lanka

7th Match: Australia v England

8th Match: England v Sri Lanka

9th Match: Australia v Sri Lanka

10th Match: England v Sri Lanka

11th Match: Australia v England

12th Match: Australia v Sri Lanka

Final series

1st Final: Australia v England

2nd Final: Australia v England

Gallery

External links
 Series home at Cricinfo

References

Australian Tri-Series
2002–03 Australian cricket season
2002 in English cricket
2003 in English cricket
2002-03
International cricket competitions in 2002–03
2002-03
2002 in Australian cricket
2003 in Australian cricket
2002 in Sri Lankan cricket
2003 in Sri Lankan cricket